Brenda Mersereau Helser (May 26, 1924 – March 26, 2001), later known by her married name Brenda Helser de Morelos, was an American former competition swimmer who won a gold medal in the women's 4×100-meter freestyle relay at the 1948 Summer Olympics in London.  A graduate of Stanford University, de Morelos grew up in Oregon where she graduated from Lincoln High School. Her swim coach was International Swimming Hall of Fame member Jack Cody.  Along with fellow 1948 Olympians Suzanne Zimmerman and Nancy Merki, Helser was part of the Multnomah Athletic Club team dubbed "Cody's Kids" that from 1939 to 1948, won 58 individual national swimming titles and three national team swimming championships.

After her retirement from competition swimming, Helser married the Comte de Morelos, a French nobleman, and became the Comtesse de Morelos y Guerrero.  She was a member of the Oregon Sports Hall of Fame and the Stanford Athletic Hall of Fame.

See also
 List of Olympic medalists in swimming (women)
 List of Stanford University people

References

External links

 "The 1940s 'feud' between a Portland glamour girl and her California rival that enthralled the swimming world" from the Oregonian, July 22, 2017

1924 births
2001 deaths
American female freestyle swimmers
Olympic gold medalists for the United States in swimming
Swimmers from Portland, Oregon
Stanford University alumni
Swimmers at the 1948 Summer Olympics
Medalists at the 1948 Summer Olympics
20th-century American women
20th-century American people